Hiroshi Shima (島 比呂志, 1918–2003, real name Kaoru Kishiue,岸上 薫) was a Japanese novelist, Hansen's disease patient and the chief editor of a literary coterie journal Kazan Chitai (Lava belt). His letter prompted a lawsuit resulting in the compensation due to the unconstitutionality of the Japanese leprosy prevention law.

Name in leprosy sanatoriums 
Because of the presence of leprosy stigma, patients in leprosy sanatoriums usually used other names than real names not only in Japan, but also in America.

Personal history 
On July 23, 1918, Hiroshi Shima was born in Kagawa Prefecture. After becoming an assistant professor at Tokyo Norin Senmon Gakko Tokyo University of Agriculture and Technology, he developed leprosy and entered Ooshima Seishoen Sanatorium in 1947, and Hoshizuka Keiaien Sanatorium, Kagoshima Prefecture in 1948. In 1958, he started a literary journal Kazan Chitai (lava belt) and he was the owner-editor. In June 1990, he received a letter from a patient "why are leprosy patients not angry", concerning the unfair treatment of leprosy patients under the Japanese leprosy prevention law. In July 1997, he wrote a letter to lawyer Ikenaga, which led to the compensation lawsuit due to the unconstitutionality of the Japanese leprosy prevention law. On June 20, 1999, he left the Hoshizuka Keiaien Sanatorium into society. On March 22, 2003, he died.

Hoshizuka Keiaien Sanatorium 
His literary ability was already known, and he was given the post of patients' association staff in charge of a journal. He was involved in various troubles within the sanatorium.
One of his friends commented that he was very good at collecting money, concerning his journal.

Works 
 Short novels in the 'Collection of leprosy literature, Vol. 3,'''
 Ringo(apple),Kimyona-kuni(A strange country), Nagata Shunsaku,Karo no Ichi(The place of a cat), Homan Chuui, Seizon sengen,
 Tamate-bako, Umino suna.
 Ikite Areba Kodansha, 1957.
 Katai(leprosy) karano kaihou(Freedom from leprosy)  Shakai Hyoronsha, 1985.
 Seizon Sengen, Shakai Hyoronsha, 1996.
 Raisha no Koe(the voice of leprosy patients) , Shakai Hyoronsha, 1988.
 The leprosy prevention law should be amended. Iwanami Booklet, 1991.
 The leprosy prevention law and the human rights of leprosy patients. Shakai Hyoronsha, 1993.

 Comments on his novels 
 By Otohiko Kaga
 He is very good at creating novels, related to leprosy and I cannot but admit his ability of creating novels. Time has changed from the days of Hojou Tamio, a noted leprosy patient-novelist when leprosy was regarded incurable and there were unchangeable circumstances such as "it cannot be helped", and the days of Shima when leprosy can be cured with chemotherapy and doors were opening from the sanatoriums. There is surely his reason for existing, in his writing novels of his own,  in view of the changing situation concerning leprosy.

 References 
 Collection of leprosy literature, Vol. 3, Novels Koseisha, 2002,  C0391 Y4800E.
 Katai karano kaihou.'' Hiroshi Shima, 1985, Shakai Hyoronsha.

Footnotes 

1918 births
2003 deaths
20th-century Japanese novelists
Leprosy activists
Academic staff of Tokyo University of Agriculture and Technology
Writers from Kagawa Prefecture